Doubletime is a documentary film about the sport of modern-day jump roping and Double Dutch. The film follows two disparate teams—one suburban white and one inner-city black—as they train to compete against each other for the very first time.

Plot
In the last 30 years, jump roping has moved off the sidewalks and onto the stage. It now features astounding acrobatics, lightning speed and international competition. Doubletime follows the top two American teams: The Bouncing Bulldogs of Chapel Hill, North Carolina and The Double Dutch Forces of Columbia, South Carolina. Although they train in neighboring states, the Bulldogs and the Forces scarcely cross paths as they belong to separate leagues that do not compete against one another.

The Bulldogs represent the best of gymnastic freestyle jumping found mostly in white suburbia while the Forces belong to the inner-city African American tradition of Double Dutch. For the first time, both the Bulldogs and the Forces decide to enter a competition at the world-famous Apollo Theater called the Holiday Classic. The film features four young athletes (age 11 to 18) who display courage, skills and charisma as they passionately prepare for the event. Doubletime culminates on stage in Harlem with this rowdy crowd-pleasing contest which features “fusion” routines where Double Dutch is blended with hip-hop dance and music.

Cast
 Ray Fredrick, coach of the Bouncing Bulldogs
 Joseph Edney, a member of the Bouncing Bulldogs
 Timothy Martin, a member of the Bouncing Bulldogs
 Erica Zenn, a member of the Bouncing Bulldogs
 Joy Holman, coach of the Double Dutch Forces
 Lacie Doolittle, a member of the Double Dutch Forces
 Antoine Cutner, a member of the Double Dutch Forces
 Tia Rankin, a member of the Double Dutch Forces
 Mike Peterson, an assistant coach of the Double Dutch Forces
 David Walker, the founder of the American Double Dutch League
 Richard Cendali, the founder of U.S.A. Jump Rope League

Awards and festivals
 Seattle Film Festival, Best Documentary
 “Best Sports Documentary” Newsday, 2007
 Heartland Film Festival, Crystal Heart Award
 South by Southwest Film Festival, Audience Award Finalist
 Tribeca Film Festival, Audience Award Nominee
 AFI/ Silverdocs
 Mill Valley Film Festival
 Edinburgh International Film Festival

See also
 Spellbound (2002 film)
 Mad Hot Ballroom

External links
 
 
 Doubletime Variety Magazine Review.
 Doubletime Austin Chronicle Review.
 Doubletime Film Threat Review.
 Bested by Japan, A Jump-Rope Team Plots a Comeback Wall Street Journal.
  Fierce Competition, In Double Time CBS News.
 / Double Dutch Is Back NPR.
 Doubletime North Carolina Public Radio.

2007 films
2007 documentary films
American sports documentary films
Documentary films about competitions
Documentary films about children
Documentary films about dance
American independent films
2007 directorial debut films
2007 independent films
2000s English-language films
2000s American films